Clóvis Anderson (born 6 September 1963) is a Brazilian former cyclist. He competed in two events at the 1988 Summer Olympics.

References

External links
 

1963 births
Living people
Brazilian male cyclists
Brazilian road racing cyclists
Olympic cyclists of Brazil
Cyclists at the 1988 Summer Olympics